Codophila varia is a species of shield bug belonging to the subfamily Pentatominae in the family Pentatomidae.

Distribution
This species is present around most of Europe (Albania, Bosnia and Herzegovina, Bulgaria, Croatia, Cyprus, France, Greece, Spain, Yugoslavia, Macedonia, Malta, Moldova, Portugal, Romania, Russia, Switzerland, Turkey, Hungary and Italy).

Description
It is a rather variable species in size and colour. Coloration of body may be pale yellow, greyish or also blood-red. These bugs have three bright longitudinal stripes on the head. Scutellum is brightly colored with a striking black drawing. The connexivum is bright with black spots. The first three segments of the antennae are usually red, the two outer ones are black. This species is very similar to Carpocoris pudicus.

Biology
These bugs can mainly be encountered  from June through August. They are polyphagous, but they mainly feed on Asteraceae (especially on Echinops spinosus)  and Apiaceae species.

References

External links
 L'ecole buissoniere

Insects described in 1787
Hemiptera of Europe
Pentatomini